Mustafa Abdul Latif Mishatat (born 5 July 1967), known as Mustafa al-Kadhimi, alternatively spelt Mustafa al-Kadhimy, is an Iraqi politician, lawyer and bureaucrat and former intelligence officer who served as the Prime Minister of Iraq from May 2020 to October 2022. He previously served as columnist for several news outlets and the Director of the Iraqi National Intelligence Service, originally appointed in June 2016. He briefly served as Iraqi Minister of Foreign Affairs in an acting capacity in 2020. The latter part of his tenure closely followed the 2022 Iraqi political crisis.

Biography
Al-Kadhimi was born in Baghdad in 1967 to Abdul Latif, who was born in Al-Shatra, a town in southern Iraq, located northeast of Nasiriyah. He later migrated from Nasiriyah to Baghdad as a student.

Al-Kadhimi was a vocal opponent of the regime of Saddam Hussein. He escaped Iraq in 1985 for Iran then Germany, before settling in the United Kingdom, and lived in exile for several years, eventually becoming a citizen of the UK.

After the 2003 American-led invasion of Iraq, al-Kadhimi returned to Iraq and cofounded the Iraqi Media Network.

He was a columnist and an editor of the Iraqi version of Al-Monitor and contributed to various outlets. He has also published a number of books and studies. Al-Kadhimi was also the senior editor of Iraq's Newsweek magazine for three years.

Al-Khadhimi studied law at Al-Turath University, was responsible for reforming the Iraqi National Intelligence Service (INIS) to be more effective and to meet international standards. He oversaw ending the politicization of intelligence action, implementing advanced methods to intelligence gathering and analysis, and setting priorities to broaden the scope of the work of the National Intelligence Service. Under his leadership, the agency expanded its remit, particularly in counter-terrorism, both internally and abroad, playing a vital role in Iraq's fight against the ISIL, also known as Daesh. During his tenure, he established links with scores of countries and bureaus working within the US-led federation against ISIL.

Prime Minister of Iraq

Following months of protests that broke out across Iraq in October 2019 and the resignation of Prime Minister Adel Abdul Mahdi and his cabinet, Mustafa Al Kadhimi became a leading contender for the premiership.

Al-Kadhimi and Haider al-Abadi went to Riyadh in 2017. Al-Kadhimi made headlines when he was seen in a long embrace with Mohammed bin Salman.

On 9 April 2020, he was named by President Barham Salih as prime minister-designate, the third person tapped to lead the country in just 10 weeks as it struggled to replace a government that fell last year after months of protests. Kadhimi was nominated by President Barham Salih, state television reported, shortly after the previous designated prime minister, Adnan al-Zurfi, announced he was withdrawing having failed to secure enough support to pass a government. After nearly six months of political negotiations, Iraq's parliament confirmed al-Kadhimi as Prime Minister of Iraq on 6 May 2020. Before entering office, al-Kadhimi said his government would be a government that finds solutions to Iraq's many problems and not a crisis ridden government. He promised early elections and vowed Iraq would not be used as a battleground by other countries. He assumed office on the heels of major upheavals in Iraq – large protests, falling oil prices, and the COVID-19 pandemic.

Upon assuming power, al-Kadhimi promised to guide Iraq through a serious financial crisis, saying the state treasury was “nearly empty” after years of waste and declining oil prices. Al-Kadhimi's cabinet vowed to reduce public spending and audit salaries granted to millions of Iraqis but retracted the plan after public criticism. In August 2020, he hired hundreds of unemployed Iraqis at the Ministry of Defense, but not enough to halt sit-ins outside other public sector offices demanding jobs. He has few allies in government and parliament is heavily dominated by pro-Iran MPs who have balked at his references to protester demands. He has also struggled to fulfill his promise to bring the security forces to justice who were allegedly responsible for the deaths of nearly 600 protesters and activists since October 2019. In addition, al-Kadhimi pledged to investigate the recent murders of journalists and political activists that have increased in the past year, but no one has been brought to justice yet.

In July 2021, al-Kadhimi and U.S. President Joe Biden sealed an agreement to end the U.S. combat mission in Iraq by the end of 2021. Following his visit to the United States, Iraq reclaimed 17,000 artifacts, mostly looted by ISIS and sold to the Museum of the Bible that were recovered by US authorities.

Criticism 
The prime minister has been criticized in failing to raise alarms when it was found that since September 2021, $2.5bn from the country's tax deposits were reported as missing, the allegations were made by the finance ministry under Prime Minister Mohammed Shia' Al Sudani. Investigators believed that the money were distributed to politicians and used for bribes and hush-money. Former Finance Minister Ali Allawi mentioned that "senior officials and corrupt businessmen siphon billion from the public purse". The large volumes traded caused the dinar to fall and property prices in posh areas in Baghdad to rise. According to the Washington Post an anti-corruption drive under Mustafa al-Kadhimi used torture and sexual violence on detainees.

Accusation for the deaths of Soleimani and al-Muhandis 
Iran and its allied Fatah Alliance heavily opposed al-Kadhimi's appointment. In April 2020, Kata'ib Hezbollah, an shia-Iraqi militia with close links to Iran and ties to the Popular Mobilization Forces, published a statement that accused al-Kadhimi of being culpable for the deaths of its leader Abu Mahdi al-Muhandis and Iranian General Qassem Soleimani and charged him with working with the United States. In the meantime, al-Kadhimi directed the Counter Terrorism Service (CTS) to investigate rocket attacks against the Green Zone in Baghdad, and promised to confront the disobedient Iranian supported paramilitaries.

Assassination attempt 
In the early hours of 7 November 2021, al-Kadhimi survived an assassination attempt via explosive drone, two drones were shot down by the army while the last one targeted his residence in the heavily fortified Green Zone district of Baghdad. The assassination attempt is suspected by many to be Iran’s response to Mustafa for his crackdown on Iranian supported militias and his strict policy of removing foreign influence in Iraq.

On 8 November, a pair of anonymous regional officials and some (also anonymous) militia sources told Reuters that Iranian-backed militias were behind the attack, such as Kata'ib Hezbollah or Asaib Ahl al-Haq, also alleging that the weapons used by the perpetrators were made in Iran.

According to experts, the assassination attempt came as a response to pro-Iranian parties losing seats in the 2021 Iraqi parliamentary election.

References

External links

 

|-

1967 births
Iraqi dissidents
Iraqi Shia Muslims
Living people
Politicians from Baghdad
Prime Ministers of Iraq
21st-century Iraqi politicians
Directors of intelligence agencies